The GER Class F48 was a class of sixty 0-6-0 steam tender locomotives designed by James Holden for the Great Eastern Railway in Great Britain.  They passed to the London and North Eastern Railway at the grouping in 1923 and received the LNER classification J16.

History 
The F48 class, of which there were sixty, were built between 1900 and 1903 at Stratford Works, and had round-top fireboxes of the same type as used on the Class S46 Claud Hamilton 4-4-0s. No. 1189 was built instead with a Belpaire firebox, being the first Great Eastern locomotive to be so fitted. This was done as a comparative experiment against the regular round-top firebox. The experiment was a success and a further thirty locomotives constructed later were fitted with Belpaire fireboxes and termed the G58 class.

Reboilering
From 1921, all the round-top boilers were replaced by the Belpaire type, the majority being superheated. Sixteen had been reboilered by the Great Eastern before the grouping of 1923. The remaining forty-three were reboilered by the London and North Eastern Railway and were re-classified J17. All had been dealt with by 1932, whereupon the Class J16 ceased to exist.

Blastpipes
At first Macallan blastpipes were fitted, but later the Stone's variable blastpipe was substituted. Plain blastpipes were substituted between 1924 and 1929.

LNER ownership
The former Class F48 locomotives were renumbered 5500–5559 in the LNER's 1946 renumbering scheme. The exception was 8200, which had been damaged beyond repair in a V-2 attack in November 1944.

BR ownership
All the remaining locomotives passed to British Railways in 1948, and had 60000 added to their number. They were withdrawn between 1953 and 1962.

Table of orders and numbers

References

External links

  — Great Eastern Railway Society
 The Holden J16 & J17 (GER Classes F48 & G58) 0-6-0 Locomotives — LNER Encyclopedia

F48
0-6-0 locomotives
Railway locomotives introduced in 1900
Standard gauge steam locomotives of Great Britain
Freight locomotives